Aranza Salut  (born 12 July 1991) is a former professional Argentine tennis player.

On 9 August 2010, she reached her career-high WTA singles ranking of 306. On 21 May 2012, she peaked at No. 288 in the WTA doubles rankings. She started playing tennis at the age of seven.

ITF Circuit finals

Singles: 12 (5 titles, 7 runner-ups)

Doubles: 26 (7 titles, 19 runner-ups)

External links
 
 
 

1991 births
Living people
Argentine female tennis players
Sportspeople from Rosario, Santa Fe
Tennis players from Buenos Aires
21st-century Argentine women